Justinian Oxenham ISO (23 April 186027 March 1932) was a senior Australian public servant. He was Secretary of the Postmaster-General's Department from January 1911 until December 1923.

Life and career
Oxenham was born in Warwick, Queensland, on 23 April 1860.

In the year of Australia's federation, Oxenham was appointed as Chief Clerk of the Postmaster-General's Department.

In January 1911 he was promoted to Secretary, heading the Postmaster-General's Department. In the position, he represented the Commonwealth at the International Postal Conference in Madrid in February 1921.

Oxenham retired from the Commonwealth Public Service in 1923.

On 27 March 1932, Oxenham died at home in Charles Street Kew, Melbourne.

Awards
Oxenham was awarded the distinction of the Imperial Service Order for his public service.

References

1860 births
1932 deaths
Australian public servants
Australian Companions of the Imperial Service Order
People from Warwick, Queensland